Anna Kazejak-Dawid (Anna Kazejak, born 15 January 1979 in Bytom) is a Polish director and screenwriter. Renowned especially for directing and writing the segment Silesia, part of the drama Oda do radości (Ode to joy, 2005), which won the Golden Lion at the 2010 Venice Film Festival. In her films she focuses on different aspects of being a woman, though she claims often her characters are based on men in her life.

Biography

Education
Kazejak-Dawid studied cultural studies at both National Film School in Łódź and University of Silesia in Katowice. In 2001 she enrolled at National Film School in Łódź to study directing. She graduated in 2008.

Career
Despite her young age, Kazejak-Dawid was met with critical acclaim, which is visible both in the positive press she received and in the nine nominations and six awards. Her newest film, Obietnica (2013), was shown at Berlin International Film Festival under the working title of the project, Word. The film can be considered quintessential to Kazejak-Dawid's style, as it both touches on a woman-oriented problem (female violence) and relays on young, inexperienced actors (Eliza Rycembel and Mateusz Więcławek).

She is a member of the European Film Academy.

Awards

Filmography

Director
 Obietnica (2013) 
 Bez tajemnic (2011, two episodes) 
 Skrzydlate świnie (2010) 
 Bocznica (2009)
 Kilka prostych słów (2007) 
 Oda do radości (the Silesia segment) (2005) 
 Jesteś tam (2004)

Writer
 Obietnica (2013) 
 Skrzydlate świnie (2010) 
 Bocznica (2009)
 Kilka prostych słów (2007) 
 Oda do radości (the Silesia segment) (2005) 
 Jesteś tam (2004)

See also 
 
 Cinema of Poland

References

Living people
Polish film directors
Polish women film directors
Polish screenwriters
Łódź Film School alumni
Year of birth missing (living people)
Polish women screenwriters